The Geneva International Peace Research Institute (GIPRI, French: Institut international de recherches pour la paix à Genève) is a non-governmental organisation based in Geneva.

It was founded in 1980 and its aim is to understand wars in order to better avoid them.

Publications 
The Cahiers du GIPRI are the main publication of the GIPRI:
 Cahier du GIPRI n°1 (2004), Droit, éthique et politique, Abdou Diouf, Aminata Dramane Traoré, Denis Collin.
 Cahier du GIPRI n°2 (2004), Frontières entre police et armée, Michel Liechti, Giovanni Arcudi, Marisa Vonlanthen.
 Cahier du GIPRI n°3 (2005), Guerre en Irak, crise internationale – les dimensions historiques, politiques et juridiques d’un conflit, Jean-Pierre Stroot, Gabriel Galice (dir.).
 Cahier du GIPRI n°4 (2006), Capitalisme, système national/mondial hiérarchisé et devenir du monde, Michel Beaud.
 Cahier du GIPRI n°5 (2007), Scénarios d’avenir pour le Burundi et l’Afrique des Grands Lacs, Angelo Barampama, Roger Eraers (dir.).
 Cahier du GIPRI n°6 (2007), La guerre est-elle une bonne affaire?, Mayeul Kaufmann, Claude Serfati, Gabriel Galice, Jacques Fontanel.
 Cahier du GIPRI n°7 (2009), Les causes des guerres à venir, Gabriel Galice (dir.).
 Cahier du GIPRI n°8 (2010), Quel avenir pour l’Irak?, Yvonne Jänchen (dir.).
 Cahier du GIPRI n°9 (2013), Regards croisés sur la guerre et la paix, Gabriel Galice (dir.).

Occasionally, the GIPRI also publishes Special Reports or Special Editions:
 Bulletin Spécial (2003), Le GIPRI et l’Irak, Gabriel Galice, Nicolas Sarkis, Laurent Calligé, Jean-Pierre Stroot.
 Hors-Série (2008), De l’Eau et de la Paix – Conflit et Coopération Israélo-palestiniens, Laurent Calligé (dir.).

Notes and references

See also 
 Maison de la paix
 Geneva Institute for Democracy and Development
 Stockholm International Peace Research Institute

External links 
 Official website

Research institutes in Switzerland
Organisations based in Geneva
Organizations established in 1980